HYENAZ are a Berlin based avant-garde electronica duo. The band consists of electronic music producers and dancers Kathryn Fischer (Mad Kate) and Adrienne Teicher. They have been called a "monster performance duo" by electroclash artist Peaches (musician) and appeared in the "Best Artists List for 2013" from Whitehot Magazine of Contemporary Art.  Their live shows have been described as a kind of physical theatre performance and the band collaborated with the Korean artist Sylbee Kim at The National Museum of Modern and Contemporary Art, Korea in August 2014 for a performance called "Spectral Rite". Their debut self-titled album was released on February 13, 2014 via Freudian/Slit and Records Ad Nauseam. Their second album Critical Magic 비평적 마술 was released on the Berlin label Springstoff on October 21, 2016.

Discography

Studio albums
HYENAZ (2014)
Critical Magic 비평적 마술 (2016)

References

External links
 

German musical duos